Choose is a crime horror film directed by Marcus Graves. The film premiered at the Halloween All-Nighter FrightFest film festival on 30 October 2011. Filming took place in New York City.

Plot

Fiona Wagner is studying for a master's degree in Journalism and still grieves for her mother Samantha who committed suicide 3 years ago. Her father, Detective Tom Wagner, is investigating the brutal death of lawyer Elliot Vincent, by the hands of his teenage daughter who is an environmentalist. His daughter was forced to choose between killing him or having her mother, younger brother and herself killed by a sadistic criminal who broke into their home. When pianist Simon Campbell is forced to choose between losing his fingers or his hearing, Tom realizes a deranged serial-killer is out on a rampage. Meanwhile, Fiona is contacted by the killer using the code name ISO_17 and thus unleashes many unanswered mysteries.

Cast

References

External links

2011 films
American crime films
2011 horror films
2010s English-language films
2010s American films